Christophe Bouchet (born 12 November 1962) is a French former journalist at Le Nouvel Observateur. He was the president of French football club Olympique de Marseille from spring 2002 to November 2004. Now, Christophe Bouchet is the president of Easi Marketing, a marketing company who especially works with Toulouse FC.

References

1962 births
Living people
Olympique de Marseille chairmen
Union of Democrats and Independents politicians
Mayors of places in Centre-Val de Loire
Writers from Tours, France
Politicians from Île-de-France